The Midnight Kiss is a lost 1926 American silent comedy film directed by Irving Cummings and starring Janet Gaynor. It was produced and distributed by Fox Film Corporation.

Cast
Richard Walling as Thomas H. Atkins Jr.
Janet Gaynor as Mildred Hastings
George Irving as Thomas H. Atkins Sr.
Doris Lloyd as Ellen Atkins
Tempe Pigott as Grandma
Gladys McConnell as Lenore Hastings
Herbert Prior as Smith Hastings
Gene Cameron as Spencer Hastings
Arthur Housman as Uncle Hector
Bodil Rosing as Swedish maid

References

External links

1926 films
American silent feature films
Lost American films
Fox Film films
Films directed by Irving Cummings
American black-and-white films
Silent American comedy films
Lost comedy films
1926 lost films
1926 comedy films
1920s American films
1920s English-language films